Nuwandhika Senarathne (born 23 June 1993) is a Sri Lankan singer and television personality who is most known as a playback singer, as well as a performer of Soprano Opera and Ghazals. She rose to fame as the 1st runner-up of the reality TV show Derana Dream Star Season IX.

Nuwandhika has been praised for her "amazing vocal abilities and charisma", and hailed for her stellar vocal poise. She earned her first award nomination for the Best Teledrama Singer - Female at the 2019-20 Raigam Tele'es Awards, for singing the theme song of Asanwara Wessak which aired on ITN.

Early life 
Nuwandhika Senarathne was born on 23 June 1993 in Narammala, Sri Lanka. She is the only child of Sunil Senarathne and Kusum Herath. She grew up in Narammala, a small town near Kurunegala. She completed her primary education at Mayurapada Primary school, Narammala. Then she attended Mayurapada Central College to complete her secondary education. She completed her Visharad Diploma in 2011 before entering the university for higher education.

She studied western music at the University of the Visual and Performing Arts and completed her university degree (Bachelor of Performing Arts Honours degree specialised in Western Music) in 2019 with a Second Class Upper division. She is an A-Grade singer at Sri Lanka Broadcasting Corporation.

Nuwandhika is currently studying for Master of Philosophy (MPhil.) Degree in Music from the University of Kelaniya.

Career 
Nuwandhika started to learn music formally when she was ten years old. She entered into Saundarya Abhimani competition(division of GHAZAL) in 2019 and won the first place and received grand prize of a full sponsorship to represent her university in the South Asian Inter-university Music Festival in India. In 2020, she competed in the TV reality show Derana Dream Star season IX and won the second place in the competition.

In October 2020, she voiced the theme song  “Obata Lanvee” with Raween Kanishka for FM Derana “Apoorva” radio drama. She was pushed more into the public sphere after she sang the theme song Sihinayak Mewna in March, 2021, for the Iskole teledrama, which was broadcast on TV Derana. Following this surge in fame, in August 2021, she voiced the theme song  “Malen Upan Samanali” with Raween Kanishka for TV Derana, Deweni Inima tele drama, which has reached over 15 million views on YouTube as of April 2022.

Nuwandhika initiated her film playback singing career in January 2021, when she voiced a duet with Supun Perera for the Sada Diya Salu movie directed by Channa Perera. In the same year, she sang the song Heeneka Paya for the film Kabaddi.

In addition to being a singer, she has hosted a TV program in TV Derana. Nuwandhika has taken part in the popular chat TV shows Maathra in Swarnawahini, and Sihinayaki Re in Rupavahini, on several occasions. Furthermore, she is a brand ambassador for SLTMobitel.

In December 2021, Nuwandhika toured Dubai with veteran musician Keerthi Pasqual for a musical evening at the Radisson Blu Deira Creek Hotel. Moreover, in May 2022, she toured Australia as a part of the Derana Stars Concert 2022 organised by TV Derana, featuring fellow contemporary singers Falan Andrea, Dulanga Sampath, Raween Kanishka, Ravi Royster, and veteran musicians Nadeeka Guruge and Keerthi Pasqual. Nuwandhika was set to tour Canada in June 2022 for the Dream Voices Canada Tour 2022 with fellow artists Falan Andrea and Suneera Sumanga; however, the tour got postponed owing to unavoidable circumstances, with the new dates yet to be announced.

Personal Life
Nuwandhika married software engineer Jayanga Kaushalya on the 27th of January, 2023.

Tours

Milestones
 "A" grade award granted by Sri Lanka Broadcasting Corporation.
 Won first place from All Island CALYPSO competition, 2011.
 Won first place from Saundarya Abhimani competition, division of GHAZAL, 2019.
 Performed on 12th South Asian Inter-university Music Festival(SAUFEST) held at Pandit Ravishankar Shukla University, Raipur(INDIA), 2019.
 Graduated(BPA(Hons.) specialized in western music) from University of the Visual and Performing Arts with a second class upper division, 2019.

Awards

Raigam Tele’es 

|-
|| 2021 ||| Mala Hiru Basa Yana - Asanwara Wessak  - ITN || Raigam Tele'es Best Teledrama Singer(Female)||

Achievements

Playback singing

Film songs

Teledrama songs

Radio drama songs

Discography

Notes

References

External links 

1993 births
Living people
21st-century Sri Lankan women singers
Sinhalese singers
English-language singers
Bengali singers
Tamil singers
Sri Lankan playback singers
Sri Lankan singer-songwriters
Sri Lankan YouTubers